Clinton Community College may refer to two institutions in the United States:

Clinton Community College (Iowa)
Clinton Community College (New York)